Trygve Moe (born 11 December 1927) is a Norwegian journalist.

He was born in Sandefjord. He was a journalist in Dagbladet from 1958 to 1973. He was the chairman of the trade union Norwegian Union of Journalists from 1964 to 1966 and 1970 to 1983, and secretary general from 1983 to 1985. He was then picture editor in the Norwegian News Agency from 1986 to 1989, and CEO from 1989 to 1994. From 1989 he also chaired the board of Kopinor.

References

1927 births
Possibly living people
Norwegian journalists
Dagbladet people
Norwegian trade unionists
People from Sandefjord